U.S. Route 81 (US 81) is a part of the U.S. Highway System that travels from Fort Worth, Texas, to the Pembina–Emerson Border Crossing near Pembina. In the state of North Dakota, US 81 extends from the South Dakota border north to the Canada-United States border.

Route description
U.S. 81 enters North Dakota concurrently with Interstate 29 (I-29). It heads north from the South Dakota border, passing through Fargo, to the north side of Grand Forks. There it splits off to the northwest, passing through the city of Manvel. It parallels I-29, passing through the town of Grafton before joining North Dakota Highway 5 (ND 5) near Cavalier. It rejoins I-29 and continues to the US–Canada border at Pembina. The original route of US 81 survives as ND 127 and 'County Road 81' in Richland, Cass, Traill, and Grand Forks counties.

Major intersections
Exit numbers are I-29 exit numbers.

References

External links

Transportation in Richland County, North Dakota
Transportation in Cass County, North Dakota
Transportation in Traill County, North Dakota
Transportation in Grand Forks County, North Dakota
Transportation in Walsh County, North Dakota
Transportation in Pembina County, North Dakota
 North Dakota
81